Humberto Albornoz Sánchez (1894–1959) was rotating chairman of the Provisional Government Junta of Ecuador from January 10 to March 10, 1926. He was Minister of Finance in the junta.

External links
 Official website about pPresidential history of the Ecuadorian Government

1894 births
1959 deaths
Presidents of Ecuador
Ecuadorian Ministers of Finance